The Speaker of the Cook Islands Parliament is the presiding officer of the Cook Islands Parliament.  The manage the House in accordance with its Standing Orders and according to the traditions of the Westminster system.

The current Speaker is Tai Tura.

Election

The Speaker is elected by the House at the beginning of a parliamentary term according to the provisions of the Cook Islands Constitution and the Standing Orders.  Unlike other Westminster systems the Speaker does not have to be a Member of Parliament, though they must be qualified to be one.  By law they may not be a Cabinet Minister.

The Constitution requires that Parliament elect the person nominated by the Prime Minister, however the parliament's Standing Orders include a process for contested elections. 

Following their election the Speaker must present themselves to the Queen's Representative to swear an oath of allegiance and lay claim to the privileges of the House. 

The Speaker holds office until they cease to be an MP (or, in the case of a Speaker who is not an MP, cease to be qualified to be one), become a Minister, are removed by a vote of the House, or Parliament is dissolved.

Deputy Speaker

The Speaker is assisted by a Deputy Speaker, elected by Parliament.  The current Deputy Speaker is Tingika Elikana.

Holders of the office

Eight people have held the office of Speaker since the creation of Parliament. A full list of Speakers is below.

References

External links
 Constitution of the Cook Islands
 Standing Orders of the Cook Islands Parliament
 Cook Islands Parliament

Cook Islands, Parliament
Politics of the Cook Islands